Sirin is a mythological creature of Rus' legends, with the head of a beautiful woman and the body of a bird (usually an owl), borrowed from the siren of the Greek mythology. According to myth, the Sirin lived in Iriy or around the Euphrates River.

History 
The legend of Sirin might have been introduced to Rus' by Persian merchants in the 8th-9th century. In the cities of Chersonesos and Kyiv she is often found on pottery, golden pendants, even on the borders of Gospel books of tenth-twelfth centuries. Due to the history, the Russian culture has experienced a very strong correlation with Byzantine Empire through its steppes,  the Volga river and Dniepr river. Pomors often depicted Sirin on the illustrations in the Book of Genesis as birds sitting in paradise trees.

Later (17-18th century), the image of Sirin changed and she started to symbolize world harmony (as she lives near paradise). People in those times believed only happy people could hear a Sirin, while only very few could see one because she is as fast and difficult to catch as human happiness. She symbolizes eternal joy and heavenly happiness.

Folklore
This half-woman half-bird is directly based on the later folklore about sirens. She was usually portrayed wearing a crown or with a nimbus. Sirin sang beautiful songs to the saints, foretelling future blisses. The bird was dangerous. Men who heard her would forget everything on earth, follow her, and ultimately die. People would attempt to save themselves from Sirin by shooting cannons, ringing bells and making other loud noises to scare the bird off.

According to folk tales, at the morning of the Apple Feast of the Saviour day, Sirin flies into the apple orchard and cries sadly. In the afternoon, the Alkonost flies to this place, beginning to rejoice and laugh. Alkonost brushes dew from her wings, granting healing powers to all fruits on the tree she is sitting on.

Sometimes Sirin is seen as a metaphor for God's word going into the soul of a man. Sometimes she is seen as a metaphor of heretics tempting the weak. Sometimes Sirin was considered equivalent to the Polish Wila. In Russian folklore, Sirin was mixed with the revered religious writer Saint Ephrem the Syrian. Thus, peasant lyrists such as Nikolay Klyuev often used Sirin as a synonym for poet.

Gallery

In popular culture

 Alternative band Birds of Tokyo have a track named "Sirin" on their March Fires Album.
 Author Vladimir Nabokov published under the pseudonym Sirin.
 A Moog synthesizer uses the name "Sirin: Analog Messenger of Joy".
 The Chinese Mobile game Honkai Impact 3rd features a character named Sirin, one of the game's major antagonists.
 "Songbird" Sirin is a female companion in the game Tyranny, who enchants people's minds with her singing.

See also
Alkonost
Gamayun

References

External links

Russian mythology
Legendary birds
Human-headed mythical creatures
Female legendary creatures
Slavic legendary creatures
Avian humanoids